Avance is a ghost town in Meade County, located in the state of South Dakota).

History
A post office called Avance was established in 1910, and remained in operation until 1951. The town had the name of John Avance, a local cattleman.

References

Geography of Meade County, South Dakota
Ghost towns in South Dakota